The UR-77 Meteorit is a Soviet mine clearing vehicle, based on a variant of the 2S1 Gvozdika chassis.

Description
The vehicle is armed with a launcher and two mine-clearing line charges. When launched, a charge causes a shock wave that destroys or disables all the shells or mines along the area of the line charge (with a width of 6 metres and length up to 90 metres).

The vehicle has also been used offensively, where its line charge has been used to destroy entire streets in urban combat in Syria and Ukraine.

Current operators
  
 
 
  Transnistria

  -  As of 21 February 2023, at least 16+ vehicles had been captured from Russian forces during the 2022 Russian invasion of Ukraine.

Similar systems
 Giant Viper
 Python

References

Military engineering vehicles of the Soviet Union
Military vehicles introduced in the 1970s
Mine warfare countermeasures
Tracked armoured fighting vehicles